Samantha Sencer-Mura (born February 2, 1989) is an American politician serving in the Minnesota House of Representatives since 2023. A member of the Minnesota Democratic-Farmer-Labor Party (DFL), Sencer-Mura represents District 63A in the Twin Cities metropolitan area, which includes parts of Minneapolis in Hennepin County, Minnesota.

Early life, education and career 
A fourth-generation Japanese-American, Sencer-Mura was raised in Minneapolis and attended Minneapolis Public Schools. She earned a Bachelor of Arts degree in social justice and critical theory from Occidental College and a Master of Education in school leadership from the Harvard Graduate School of Education.

Sencer-Mura began her career as a teacher at Citizen Schools. She later worked as a coordinator at Safe Passages and community schools director of United for Success Academy in Oakland, California. In 2017, Sencer-Mura returned to Minneapolis to join 826 MSP, a non-profit after-school program, as executive director.

Minnesota House of Representatives 
Sencer-Mura was first elected to the Minnesota House of Representatives in 2022, after redistricting and the retirement of DFL incumbent Jim Davnie.  She serves on the Agriculture Finance and Policy, Education Finance, Workforce Development Finance and Policy, and Transportation Finance and Policy Committees.

Electoral history

Personal life 
Sencer-Mura lives in Minneapolis, Minnesota with her partner, Lance, and has one child.

References

External links 

Members of the Minnesota House of Representatives
Living people
American politicians of Japanese descent
American women of Japanese descent in politics
Minnesota Democrats
Women state legislators in Minnesota
Politicians from Minneapolis
Occidental College alumni
Harvard Graduate School of Education alumni
Educators from Minnesota

1989 births